Palatak is a 1963 Bengali film directed by Jatrik. The film features actors Anup Kumar, Sandhya Roy and Ruma Guha Thakurta in the lead roles. The film was based on Angti Chattujjer Vai, a Bengali short story of Manoj Basu. Shyamsundar Ghosh composed the music for the film. The movie was remade in Hindi in 1969 as Rahgir.

Plot 
A man Basanta Chatujje (describing himself as Angti Chattujje's brother) who couldn't stand bounds and chains bitten by wanderlust. In spite of the fact that he hailed from a rich Zamindari family and could have lived in comfort, his wanderlust took him to newer and different places where he encountered new people and mingled with their lives. He marries a woman Harimati and returns home to his family with his wife. But after few days unaware of the fact that his wife is pregnant, he leaves her to go on another journey.

Cast
 Anup Kumar as Basanta Chatujje
 Sandhya Roy as Harimati
 Anubha Gupta as Golap
 Arun Mukherjee
 Ruma Guha Thakurta as Moyna
 Jahar Ganguly
 Jahor Roy
 Rabi Ghosh
 Asit Baran
 Amar Biswas
 Bharati Devi
 Shyamal Ghoshal
 Asha Devi
 Tinu Ghosh

Soundtrack 
"Aha Krishna Kalo" - Hemant Kumar
"Dosh Diyo Na Amay Bondhu" - Hemant Kumar
"Jibanpurer Pathik Re Bhai" - Hemant Kumar
"Sakhi Hey Amar Jware Anga" - Hemant Kumar
"Chinite Parini Bondhu" - Ruma Guha Thakurta, Geeta Dutt
"Mon Je Amar Kemon Kemon Kare" - Ruma Guha Thakurta, Geeta Dutt
"Aha Re Bidhi Go" - Pankaj Mitra

Awards 
 BFJA Awards  (1964) for
 Best Actor - Anup Kumar
 Best Actress in supporting role - Ruma Guha Thakurta

References

External links

1963 films
Indian black-and-white films
Bengali-language Indian films
1960s Bengali-language films
Bengali films remade in other languages
Films based on Indian novels
Films scored by Hemant Kumar